Gizmachi is an American heavy metal band from Newburgh, New York, formed in 1998. They are signed to Big Orange Clown Records a subsidiary of Sanctuary Records owned by Shawn "Clown" Crahan. Gizmachi was one of the bands on the second stage of Ozzfest in 2005. Vocalist Sean Kane also appeared on Mushroomhead's Savior Sorrow album, on the track "Tattoo". The band had Soilwork frontman Björn "Speed" Strid handle the vocals on this forthcoming record, which was produced/engineered by Jay Hannon (Byzantine, Gods Below Us) and mixed by Mark Lewis (DevilDriver, The Black Dahlia Murder). Strid commented of his involvement:"Being a part of the new Gizmachi record was one of the most challenging adventures I've experienced. I can honestly say that I've grown as a metal singer since recording these vocals."

Discography

Albums
Melee (2003)
The Imbuing (2005)
Omega Kaleid (2021)

Members
 Sean Kane – vocals
 Jason Hannon – lead guitar
 Mike Laurino – vocals, guitars
 Kris Gilmore – bass
 Jimmie Hatcher – drums

References

External links

 Gizmachi's Kickstarter project successfully raised its funding goal on May 18, 2012.

Metalcore musical groups from New York (state)
American nu metal musical groups
Heavy metal musical groups from New York (state)
Musical groups established in 1998
American progressive metal musical groups